Kärdla is the only town on the island of Hiiumaa, Estonia. It is the capital of Hiiu County and the administrative center of Hiiumaa Parish.

Geography
Kärdla is located on the northeastern coast of Hiiumaa, by the Tareste Bay; to the southeast of the town lies the  455 million year old Kärdla meteorite crater. Several small rivers flow through the town. There are also artesian wells in Kärdla. The Swedish name Kärrdal means "marsh valley"; the town is located in a lowlands valley.

History
Kärdla was first mentioned in 1564 as a village inhabited by Swedes. Its growth was greatly influenced by the cloth factory founded in 1830. A port was built in 1849. Both the port and the factory were destroyed in World War II.

Kärdla officially became a borough in 1920, and a town in 1938. In 2013 the town was merged with Kõrgessaare Parish to establish Hiiumaa Parish, therefore Kärdla lost its municipality status.

Population

Transport
There are up to 10 ferry departures a day operated by TS Laevad. In the summer weekends, getting car space on the ferry usually requires advance booking. There are about 2 scheduled buses a day between Tallinn (the capital of Estonia) and Kärdla.

There are no scheduled passenger boats directly to Kärdla.

Kärdla is served by Kärdla Airport, with regular flights to Tallinn.

Kärdla town itself is small enough to get around on foot. Bicycle rental is available, and there is a good bicycle path built from Kärdla towards Kõrgessaare.

Events
June's first weekend annual Hiiumaa Children's festival takes place.

In the first week of August, the coffee-loving people of Kärdla expect visitors to Kärdla Cafés' Day celebrated just for one day in their own gardens, serving coffee and home-made pastry.

Notable people
Hillar Eller (1939–2010), politician
Heiki Nabi (born 1985), Olympic wrestler
Eveli Saue (born 1984), biathlete and orienteer
Erkki-Sven Tüür (born 1959), composer

International relations

Twin towns – Sister cities
The former municipality of Kärdla was twinned with:
 - Georgioupoli, Greece

Gallery

References

External links
 
 

Cities and towns in Estonia
Hiiumaa Parish
Populated places in Hiiu County
Populated coastal places in Estonia
Kreis Wiek
Former municipalities of Estonia